is a private junior college in Kurayoshi, Tottori, Japan. Founded in 1971 as a junior women's college, it became coeducational in 2001. The nickname of the school is Toritan.

External links 
  

Educational institutions established in 1971
1971 establishments in Japan
Private universities and colleges in Japan
Universities and colleges in Tottori Prefecture
Japanese junior colleges
Kurayoshi, Tottori